Urdenbach is an urban quarter of Düsseldorf, part of Borough 9. It is located in the south of the city, next to the neighboring town Monheim am Rhein and bordered by the river Rhine.

History
The river Rhine changed its way in the 14th century at the place where Urdenbach is located today. It was not only a fishing settlement, but a place of trading. There are a lot of timber framed houses, built up in that era. The Calvinist Church is from the year 1692, constructed in the baroque style. The Roman Catholic Church was built in Neo-romanesque style in 1893. Urdenbach became part of Düsseldorf in 1929.

The Benrath line, the line between northern German pronunciations and southern German pronunciations goes across Urdenbach.

Statistics

 Grundschule: 2
 Gymnasiums: 1
 no highway connection, no station, no tram line
 2 bus lines (784, 788)
 1 federal road tangenting Urdenbach

Gallery

References

Urban districts and boroughs of Düsseldorf